Derrick Vincent Thomas (January 1, 1967 – February 8, 2000), nicknamed "D.T.", was an American football linebacker for the Kansas City Chiefs of the National Football League (NFL). Considered one of the greatest pass rushers of all time, he played 11 seasons with the Chiefs until his death in 2000. Thomas played college football at Alabama, where he won the Butkus Award, and was selected fourth overall by Kansas City in the 1989 NFL Draft. During his career, he received nine Pro Bowl and two first-team All-Pro selections, and set the single-game sacks record.

After the Chiefs' 1999 season, Thomas was rendered paraplegic by a car crash and died two weeks later from a pulmonary embolism. He was posthumously inducted to the Pro Football Hall of Fame in 2009 and the College Football Hall of Fame in 2014.

Early life
Born in Miami, Florida, Thomas was raised by his mother Edith Morgan. His father, Air Force Captain and B-52 pilot Robert James Thomas, died during a mission in the Vietnam War. Thomas started playing football when he was three years old, and played his high school football at South Miami Senior High School.

College career
Alongside Cornelius Bennett and later Keith McCants at Alabama, Thomas spearheaded one of the best defensive lines in college football and smashed many Crimson Tide defensive records, including sacks in a single season. He was awarded the Butkus Award in 1988. He was also selected as a consensus All-American at the conclusion of the 1988 season, a season which culminated in the Crimson Tide's thrilling 29-28 victory over Army in the 1988 Sun Bowl. In 2000, Thomas was named a Sun Bowl Legend. He was awarded the Sington Soaring Spirit Award by the Lakeshore Foundation. This annual award is named for University of Alabama football legend Fred Sington. Thomas was inducted to the College Football Hall of Fame in 2014.

Professional career

Thomas was selected fourth overall in the first round of the 1989 NFL Draft by the Kansas City Chiefs. He was the first selection made by new head coach Marty Schottenheimer.

Thomas would record his first career sack in the Chiefs week 2 game against the Los Angeles Raiders. That game was also his first multi-sack game as he finished with 2.5 sacks. He would record another 7.5 sacks that season finishing with 10 his rookie year. He was named AP Defensive Rookie of the Year. He was also named to the Pro Bowl.

In his second year, Thomas recorded at least a half of a sack in each of the Chiefs first 5 games. In the Chiefs week 10 game against the Seattle Seahawks, he broke Fred Dean's 7-year old record of sacks in a single game with 7 sacks. However, on the game's final play, Thomas had a clear shot for an eighth sack, but missed it and the Seahawks would throw a game winning touchdown after the missed sack. He would later call that play the one play in his career he wished he could have a second chance at. He would finish the season with what would prove to be a career high 20 sacks, setting a franchise record that stood until it was broken by Justin Houston in 2014. He finished 2nd in defensive player of the year voting and was named 1st team All-Pro.

The following season, he would record his first career touchdown on a 23-yard fumble return for a touchdown in the Chiefs week 11 game against the Los Angeles Rams.

Thomas would record double digits sacks for each of the first four seasons in his career. In total, 7 of his 11 seasons in the NFL he recorded double digit sack totals.

In the Chiefs 1999 season, Thomas recorded a career low for sacks with 7. He would also record his first career interception in the Chiefs week 8 win over the San Diego Chargers. He would record the final sack of his career in the Chiefs week 15 against the Pittsburgh Steelers. In what would be the final game of his career, as he would die 37 days later, the Chiefs played their rival the Oakland Raiders. With a victory in the game, the Chiefs would qualify for the playoffs. The Chiefs lost in overtime 41–38. He didn't manage to record a sack on his former teammate Rich Gannon, but he did record 6 total tackles.

Legacy
Thomas was named 1st team All-Pro 2 times and was named to the Pro Bowl 9 times. He is 17th all-time in sacks and at the time of his death in 2000, he was 9th all-time with 126.5. He remains the Chiefs' all-time leader in sacks, safeties, forced fumbles, fumble recoveries, and defensive touchdowns. During his career, he recorded 1 interception and recovered 19 fumbles, returning them for 161 yards and 4 touchdowns. Thomas said in interviews his favorite quarterback to sack was Denver Broncos quarterback John Elway, who he sacked 26 times. The sack total over Elway is most against any quarterback in Thomas' career and the most any individual player sacked Elway. He was posthumously inducted into the Chiefs Hall of Fame in 2000, with the Chiefs breaking the tradition of waiting four years after the end of the player's career. In 2009, he was posthumously inducted into the Pro Football Hall of Fame. Later that same year, the Chiefs retired the number 58 in honor of him. Following his death until it was officially retired, the Chiefs did not reissue the number. The Chiefs also named their player of the year award in Thomas' honor, an award he won twice himself prior to the award being named in his honor.

NFL career statistics

Death
On January 23, 2000, Thomas' 1999 Chevrolet Suburban went off Interstate 435 in Clay County as he and two passengers were driving to Kansas City International Airport during a snowstorm for a flight to St. Louis to watch the NFC Championship Game between the St. Louis Rams and the Tampa Bay Buccaneers. Police reports indicated that Thomas, who was driving, was speeding at approximately 70 mph even though snow and ice were rapidly accumulating on the roadway. Thomas and one of the passengers were not wearing seat belts and both were thrown from the car; the passenger, Michael Tellis, was killed instantly. The second passenger, who was wearing his safety belt, walked away from the scene uninjured. Thomas was left paralyzed from the chest down. By early February, Thomas was being treated at Miami's Jackson Memorial Hospital. The morning of February 8, 2000, while being transferred from his hospital bed to a wheelchair on his way to therapy, Thomas told his mother he was not feeling well. His eyes then rolled back, recalled Frank Eismont, an orthopedic surgeon at Jackson Memorial Hospital. Eismont said Thomas went into cardiorespiratory arrest and died as a result of a pulmonary embolism, a massive blood clot that developed in his legs and traveled to his lungs. Months later, Thomas' family sued General Motors for $73 million in damages stemming from the accident. In 2004, a jury ruled that the family was not entitled to any money.

Charity work
In 1990, Thomas founded the Derrick Thomas Third and Long Foundation. The foundation's mission is to "sack illiteracy" and change the lives of 9- to 13-year-old urban children facing challenging and life-threatening situations in the Kansas City area.

The Derrick Thomas Academy, a charter school in Kansas City, Missouri, opened in September 2001. It served nearly 1,000 children from kindergarten through eighth grade until it closed in 2013.

Sources

External links
 
 
 Derrick Thomas on Find A Grave

1967 births
2000 deaths
Alabama Crimson Tide football players
All-American college football players
American Conference Pro Bowl players
American football defensive ends
American football outside linebackers
College Football Hall of Fame inductees
Deaths from pulmonary embolism
Kansas City Chiefs players
National Football League Defensive Rookie of the Year Award winners
National Football League players with retired numbers
Pro Football Hall of Fame inductees
South Miami Senior High School alumni
Players of American football from Miami
100 Sacks Club